The following is a list of notable people who were born in, lived in for a significant length of time or are buried in Letterkenny, the largest town in County Donegal, Ireland.

Arts
 Stopford Augustus Brooke – writer
 Jean Glover – entertainer
 Redmond Herrity – sculptor
 Gerard Lough – filmmaker
 Amybeth McNulty – actress
 John Nee – actor
 Paddy Tunney – singer

Ecclesiastical
 Philip Boyce – Bishop of Raphoe (1995–2017)
 Séamus Hegarty – Bishop of Raphoe (1982–1994)
 William MacNeely – Bishop of Raphoe (1923–1963); oversaw the completion of the town's cathedral
 James Whyte – Third Roman Catholic Bishop of Dunedin, New Zealand (1920–1957)

Media
 John Breslin – Highland Radio broadcaster
 Richard Crowley – RTÉ reporter
 Shaun Doherty – Highland Radio broadcaster
 Declan Harvey - Journalist and BBC News presenter
 Donal Kavanagh – Highland Radio newsreader
 Noel Slevin – Donegal Democrat journalist and Donegal on Sunday columnist

Politics
 Harry Blaney – T.D.; brother of Neil; father of Niall
 Neil Blaney (known as "Neil T. Blaney") – T.D. and Minister; brother of Harry; uncle of Niall
 Niall Blaney – T.D.; son of Harry; nephew of Neil
 Ciaran Brogan – Politician
 Jimmy Harte – Politician
 Rev John Kinnear – M.P. and 1870s tenant rights campaigner
 Dessie Larkin – Mayor
 Don Lydon – Senator
 Terry McEniff – Politician; businessman
 Ian McGarvey – Politician
 Gerry McMonagle – Politician
 Seán Maloney – Politician
 Jim McDaid – T.D. and Minister
 Bernard McGlinchey – Senator
 Joe McHugh – T.D. and Minister
 John O'Donnell – Politician
 Walter Patterson – first British colonial governor of Prince Edward Island

Sport
 Tony Blake – Gaelic footballer
 Brendan Boyce – athlete and 2012 London Olympian
 Eddie Brennan – Gaelic footballer
 Martin Carney – Gaelic footballer and RTÉ Sport commentator
 Paul Carr – Gaelic footballer
 Jim Clarke – Gaelic footballer
 Gary Crossan – athlete
 Mark Crossan – Gaelic footballer
 Philip Deignan – cyclist and 2008 Beijing Olympian
 Brendan Devenney – Gaelic footballer
 Eamonn Doherty – Gaelic footballer
 Conall Dunne – Gaelic footballer
 Paul Durcan – Gaelic footballer
 Mark English – Olympic middle-distance runner; multiple European Athletics Championships medalist
 Sean Ferriter – Gaelic footballer
 Dale Gorman – association footballer
 Gareth Gorman – association footballer
 Ciara Grant – association footballer
 Ciaran Greene – Gaelic footballer and association footballer
 John Hannigan – Gaelic footballer
 John Haran – Gaelic footballer
 Seamus Hoare – Gaelic footballer
 Sinead Jennings – Olympian rower
 Rory Kavanagh – Gaelic footballer
 Karl Lacey – Gaelic footballer
 Conrad Logan – association footballer
 Christopher Malseed – association footballer
 Tommy McCafferty – kickboxer
 Danny McDaid – Olympian; marathon champion
 Colm McFadden – Gaelic footballer
 Mark McGowan – Gaelic footballer
 Kevin McHugh – association footballer
 Denis McLaughlin – association footballer
 Patrick McMillan – alpine ski racer
 Seán McVeigh – hurler
 Cillian Morrison – Gaelic footballer and association footballer
 Conor Morrison – Gaelic footballer
 Charlie Mulgrew – Gaelic footballer
 Michael Murphy – Gaelic footballer
 Niall O'Donnell – Gaelic footballer
 Conor Parke – hurler
 Shaun Patton – Gaelic footballer and association footballer
 Kevin Rafferty – Gaelic footballer
 Tommy Ryan – Gaelic footballer
 Caolan Ward – Gaelic footballer
 Ross Wherity – Gaelic footballer and Australian rules footballer
 Joe Winston – Gaelic footballer

Others
 Francis Alison (1705-1779) – founder of the University of Delaware
 Edward Boyce (1862-1941) – trade unionist
 Conrad Gallagher (born 1971) – chef
 Pat Gibson (born 1961) – quizzer; won the UK version of Who Wants to Be a Millionaire? (2004); won Mastermind (2005); won the BBC Radio 4 quiz show Brain of Britain (2006); won Mastermind Champion of Champions (2010); features as the Seventh Egghead on Eggheads
 Sheelagh Harbison (1914-2012) -  Irish medieval historian
 Frank Larkin (1972-2020) – disability rights activist
 Redmond O'Hanlon (1640-1681) – outlaw

See also
 List of Donegal people

References

People
Letterkenny